Evergreen Cemetery is a garden style cemetery in the Deering neighborhood of Portland, Maine. With  of land, it is the largest cemetery in the state.  Established in 1855 in what was then Westbrook, the cemetery is home to one of the state's most prominent collections of funerary art.  The  historical portion of the cemetery was listed on the National Register of Historic Places in 1992.

History
The cemetery was established in 1855 in Saccarappa (Westbrook) and became the area's main cemetery after the Western Cemetery. As of March 2011, only  were used for cemetery-related activities. The cemetery holds the records for Forest City Cemetery in South Portland. In April 2014, it was announced the cemetery would add an additional 800 to 1,000 gravesites near the main entrance while also adding a columbarium, which will hold cremated remains above ground. An estimated 60,000 to 70,000 people are interred in the cemetery.

Description
The main areas of the cemetery are laid out in with winding curvilinear paths, typical of the rural cemetery movement popular in the 19th century, while later sections of the cemetery are typically (but not entirely) laid out in a more rectilinear fashion.  A number of architecturally significant mausoleums are located in the cemetery, the most prominent of which are the Chisholm Tomb and the F.O.J. Smith Tomb; the former is a small-scale Classical Revival replica of the Maison Carrée, a Roman temple in Nîmes, France.

Wilde Memorial Chapel
Wilde Memorial Chapel is a Gothic-style chapel. It was built as a mortuary chapel by Falmouth native Mary Ellen Lunt Wilde in 1890. It was designed by Portland architect Frederick A. Tompson and gifted to the city in 1902. The granite building is used for both memorial and wedding services, with a maximum capacity of 105.

Civil War veterans
Evergreen Cemetery contains the remains of about 1,400 veterans of the American Civil War. A memorial to Civil War veterans was donated by brothers Henry (then Governor of Maine) and Judge Nathan Cleaves and dedicated on May 30, 1895. The monument consists of a metal soldier standing atop a granite base.

Notable interments

 John Appleton, congressman and assistant secretary of state
 James Phinney Baxter, businessman and Mayor of Portland
 Carroll Lynwood Beedy, congressman
 Hugh J. Chisholm, paper magnate
 Asa William Henry Clapp, congressman
 Nathan Clifford, US Attorney General and Associate Justice of the US Supreme Court
 Lydia Neal Dennett, abolitionist and suffragist
 Neal Dow, mayor, general, candidate for president, and father of the Prohibition Movement
 Francis H. Fassett, architect
 James D. Fessenden, general
 Francis Fessenden, general
 Samuel Fessenden, lieutenant
 Samuel C. Fessenden, congressman
 Thomas Amory Deblois Fessenden, congressman
 William P. Fessenden, congressman, senator and secretary of the treasury
 Frank Fixaris, sportscaster
 Elbridge Gerry, congressman
 Charles Goddard (1879–1951), playwright and screenwriter
 Robert Christian Hale, lieutenant and congressman
 Obed Hall, congressman
 Asher Crosby Hinds, congressman
 Charles Thornton Libby, historian, genealogist and lawyer
 John Lynch, congressman
 Charles Mattocks, general
 Joseph C. Noyes, congressman
 Albion Parris Governor, congressman, judge. 
 John J. Perry, congressman
 William Lebaron Putnam, mayor
 Thomas Brackett Reed, congressman and Speaker of the US House of Representatives
 Ether Shepley, senator
 George Foster Shepley, general
 Francis Ormand Jonathan Smith, congressman
 John Calvin Stevens, architect
 Lorenzo De Medici Sweat, congressman
 Henry Goddard Thomas, general
 William W. Thomas Jr., politician
 Charles W. Walton, congressman

Gallery

See also
 National Register of Historic Places listings in Portland, Maine

Notes

External links

 Friends of Evergreen Cemetery
 
 Portland Trails – Evergreen Cemetery

Cemeteries on the National Register of Historic Places in Maine
Cemeteries in Portland, Maine
1855 establishments in Maine
Westbrook, Maine
National Register of Historic Places in Portland, Maine
Rural cemeteries
Cemeteries established in the 1850s